Evans Hall is the statistics, economics, and mathematics building on the campus of the University of California, Berkeley.

Computer History importance 
Evans Hall also served as the gateway for the entire west coast's ARPAnet access during the early stages of the Internet's existence; at the time, the backbone was a 56kbit/s line to Chicago.

Because of its proximity to the engineering school, and the location of both the departments of Computer Science, and Mathematics, Evans Hall was the building in which the original vi text editor was programmed, as well as the birthplace of Berkeley Unix (BSD), and Rogue, which was further developed there by Glenn C Wickman, and Michael Toy. Rogue's origins included the curses library, which Rogue was originally written to test. Additionally, both Ingres and Postgres were originally coded in Evans, under Prof. Michael Stonebraker's direction.

The office of Professor Doug Cooper, who wrote the widely used programming textbook "Oh! Pascal!", was in this building.

Architecture

Construction
Evans Hall is situated at the northeast corner of campus, just east of Memorial Glade. It was built in 1971 and is named after Griffith C. Evans, chairman of mathematics from 1934 to 1949 who combined the fields of mathematics and economics. The architect was Gardner Dailey.

In the 1990s, this building saw significant renovation including seismic retrofits and a new paint job. Today, the building sports a blue-green exterior with orange-red accents.

Safety concerns

As part of the University's New Century Plan, the building is recommended for demolition and replacement, due in part to its unsafe earthquake readiness rating. In 2000, it was proposed that two shorter buildings replace Evans Hall.

Although Evans Hall's seismic rating is poor, the rating is common on the UC Berkeley campus with over fifty buildings sharing the rating. A rating of poor translates to that a major earthquake would likely cause "significant structural damage and appreciable life hazards".

During the early 2000s, because of rusting of the frame of the building, "large pieces of concrete began falling off the face of Evans Hall without warning". Repairing the building cost two million dollars.

In February 2022, the University announced that due to cost, Evans Hall will not be seismically renovated and will be demolished.

Aesthetic complaints
Evans Hall was voted one of the ugliest buildings in UC Berkeley by its student body.

Evans Hall is known for its large number of windowless classrooms. The Chronicle of Higher Education has called it "an imposing concrete structure that most people on the campus would like to see demolished". Former chancellor Robert M. Berdahl has described the building as without "stirrings of pride in placement, or massing, or architectural design". Some complain the building disturbs the view of the San Francisco Bay.

Math related murals have been painted inside the building in protest against its aesthetics.

Evans Hall was repainted a gray-green so that the building would blend into the Berkeley hills.

Rumors and legends

Suicides
A series of students at the university have committed suicide at Evans Hall, primarily by jumping off ninth or tenth floors of the building. This has led some to believe the building is haunted. It has also spawned an untrue rumor that the University has put a "suicide alarm" on the tenth floor of Evans Hall.

Unabomber
There is a widespread rumor that math professor Theodore Kaczynski taught in Evans Hall. He would later become an environmental terrorist known as the Unabomber. Official publications from the University have repeated the rumor. In reality, it is impossible that Kaczynski taught in Evans Hall as he left the University in 1969 and the building was not constructed until 1971. He actually had his office in temporary buildings that have since been torn down.

References

External links

Evans Hall — The Daily Californian
 Alfred Twu. Evans Hall — Open Computing Facility

Skyscraper office buildings in California
University of California, Berkeley buildings
Buildings and structures completed in 1971
Brutalist architecture in California
Modernist architecture in California
1971 establishments in California